The Lakes International Comic Art Festival, often referred to as LICAF, is an annual comics art festival. Established in 2013, the not-for-profit festival takes place for a weekend in October each year. From 2013 until 2021 LICAF took place in Kendal, a market town on the edge of the English Lake District, United Kingdom. In 2022 LICAF moved to multiple venues in Bowness-on-Windermere for the tenth festival, in South Lakeland, Cumbria.

Comics Laureate 
The Lakes International Comic Art Festival established the Comics Laureate in 2015.

Dave Gibbons, best known for his artwork on Watchmen as well as numerous projects for Marvel, DC Comics and 2000AD, was appointed as the inaugural Comics Laureate in February 2015.

During the opening event at the Lakes International Comic Art Festival in October 2016, Charlie Adlard was announced as the second Comics Laureate. Charlie Adlard is the artist behind The Walking Dead comic book series, now a TV series and video game. He has also worked on many other comic projects including 2000AD, Mars Attacks, the X-Files, Judge Dredd and X-Men.

Brighton-based comic artist Hannah Berry was named as the third Comic Laureate in 2018.

In October 2020 Stephen L. Holland, co-owner and curator of Page 45 a comic book shop in Nottingham, was appointed the fourth Comics Laureate.

Beatrix Potter Reimagined 

To celebrate the 200th Anniversary of Cumbrian author and illustrator Beatrix Potter in 2016, the festival launched a student competition Beatrix Potter Reimagined. International comic artists, including Luke McGarry, Duncan Fegredo, Hannah Berry and Charlie Adlard, also contributed artworks that interpreted Beatrix Potter’s tales with a modern comic art style.

The Sergio Aragonés International Award for Excellence in Comic Art 
At the fifth festival in October 2017, cartoonist Sergio Aragonés launched a new accolade in the comic art industry, the “Sergio Aragonés International Award for Excellence in Comic Art”.

The award was established as a partnership between the National Cartoonists Society and the Lakes International Comic Art Festival. The first award was presented by Sergio Aragonés to English artist Dave McKean. In October 2018 Birmingham-based cartoonist Hunt Emerson became the second recipient of the Sergio Aragonés International Award for Excellence in Comic Art. 

In 2019 The Walking Dead artist Charlie Adlard won the Sergio Aragonés International Award For Excellence In Comic Art at the Reubens Awards at the inaugural NCSFest in Huntington Beach, California.

French cartoonist Boulet became the fourth recipient of the Sergio Aragonés Award for Excellence in Comic Art during the opening gala of the Lakes International Comic Art Festival in Kendal, England in 2021.

On Saturday 15 October 2022, cartoonist Posy Simmonds was announced as the fifth winner of the Sergio Aragonés International Award for Excellence in Comic Art at The Lakes International Comic Art Festival in Bowness-on-Windermere, Lake District, Cumbria, United Kingdom.

Traces of the Great War 

The sixth Lakes International Comic Art Festival in 2018 saw the official launch of Traces of the Great War, an anthology of illustrated short stories featuring over twenty international comic book artists, graphic novelists and writers. The publication was part of 14–18 NOW, the UK’s arts programme commemorating the World War I centenary.

NCSFest 
In partnership with the Lakes International Comic Art Festival, the National Cartoonists Society hosted the inaugural NCSFest in downtown Huntington Beach, California, United States, from 17 to 19 May 2019.

External links
Website

References

Comics conventions
Cultural festivals in the United Kingdom
Recurring events established in 2013
Festivals in Cumbria
Arts festivals in England
2013 establishments in England
Kendal
Lake District